Tough Enough (German title: Knallhart) is a German film directed by Detlev Buck, based on the novel Knallhart by Gregor Tessnow and released in 2006. Main actors are David Kross and Jenny Elvers. The screenplay is written by Gregor Tessnow and Zoran Drvenkar.

Plot
"When Miriam splits up with her wealthy lover, she and her 15-year-old son Michael have to move from posh Zehlendorf to run-down Berlin-Neukölln. The boy finds friends in his new neighborhood, but at school he is victimized and pressed for money by Erol and his gang. Handing over money from a burglary rather serves to encourage the bullies instead of warding them off, so Michael is desperately looking for a better solution."

Cast 
 David Kross - Michael Polischka
 Jenny Elvers - Miriam Polischka 
 Erhan Emre - Hamal
 Oktay Özdemir - Erol 
  - Barut
  - Crille
  - Matze
  - Kommissar Gerber
 Jan Henrik Stahlberg - Dr. Klaus Peters
  - Lisa
 Georg Friedrich - Holger Hagenbeck

See also 
 Rage (2006)

Footnotes

External links

Movie site in German

German crime drama films
2000s German-language films
Films set in Berlin
Films directed by Detlev Buck
Films about bullying
2000s German films